Greyzone is a Swedish-Danish thriller drama series, co-created and written by Morten Dragsted, Oskar Söderlund, Mikkel Bak Sørensen and Rasmus Thorsen that first broadcast on 22 February 2018 on C More. Starring Birgitte Hjort Sørensen as drone expert Victoria Rahbek, Greyzone centres on the days leading up to a terror attack and Victoria's kidnap at the hands of a terror cell who require access to the technological arsenal of her employers, SparrowSat.

The series also aired on TV4 in Sweden under the title Gråzon, on TV2 in Denmark and on Channel 4 in the United Kingdom, premiering on 13 February 2019, and airing weekly at 10:45pm. The entire series was also made available to watch on All 4.

Cast
Birgitte Hjort Sørensen as Victoria Rahbek, a Danish engineer for Swedish drone company SparrowSat 
Ardalan Esmaili as Iyad Adi Kassar, a Swedish-Syrian terrorist and former classmate of Victoria
Joachim Fjelstrup as Detective Jesper Lassen, Danish Security and Intelligence Service (PET) 
Tova Magnusson as Detective Inspector Eva Forsberg, Swedish Security Service (SÄPO)
Lars Ranthe as Henrik Dalum, Danish Security and Intelligence Service (PET) Head of Operations
Johan Rabaeus as Major Lars Björklund, Swedish Military Intelligence and Security Service (MUST)
Virgil Katring-Rasmussen as Oskar Rahbek Lindsbye, Victoria's son
Christopher Wollter as Johan Hedmark, Victoria's boss at SparrowSat
Özlem Saglanmak as Marjan Rajavi, Danish Security and Intelligence Service (PET) Intelligence Analyst
Kida Khodr Ramadan as Rami Wahim / Al-Shishani, the Lebanese leader of Islamic terror organisation Sayf
Karin Franz Körlof as Linda Laaksonen, Victoria's colleague at SparrowSat
Olaf Højgaard as Claes Palova, a Danish man working with Al-Shishani and Sayf
Jessica Liedberg as Christina Helander, Swedish Security Service (SÄPO)
Morten Kirkskov as Major Andreas Tange, Danish Defence Intelligence Service (FE)
Thomas Niehaus as Martin Okmann, German Federal Intelligence Service (BND)

Episodes

References

Swedish drama television series
Danish drama television series
Television shows set in Denmark
Television shows set in Sweden
Swedish-language television shows
Danish-language television shows